Steve Free (born September 16, 1950) is an American musician.

Early career
Steve Free was born near Portsmouth, Ohio, on September 16, 1950, When he was 3, he moved to Tucson, Arizona for a short time and before returning to Ohio at age 9 where he graduated from Northwest High School, Scioto County, Ohio in 1968.  He served in Air Force 1969-1973, where he took up the guitar and began writing songs.

Around this time he met Philadelphia, Pennsylvania native John Starkey and formed a folk trio in Philadelphia. There, they recorded and released songs on two small record labels. In 1990, Free signed with Fraternity Records, which is his current label. He shot to national attention in 1993 with his song about the Ohio Prison riot entitled "Siege at Lucasville", which was used by the television series 48 Hours when they covered the story about the prison riot on their program.

Today
Free is a known recording artist who has been called the "Appalachian Jimmy Buffett." Additionally, Cashbox Records has labeled him one of the most diverse artists known in music today. Free won eight ASCAP Awards, received a Platinum Award, and Charted 14 songs on the national and international charts, including his "number one" song "Just a Baby Boy", which is becoming a worldwide Christmas song. In 2008, he was awarded The State of Ohio's Governor's Award as "Individual Artist." He received an arts award from the Kentucky State Senate in 2009 for his musical contributions to Appalachia. He has charted over 40 songs on the National and International Charts and has 3 Americana Music Award nominations.

Steve Free is an internationally acclaimed award-winning singer/songwriter/recording artist. The winner of numerous Music Industry Awards including 9 ASCAP Awards, a Platinum Record and a Grammy nomination he has charted over 30 songs on the National & International, Americana, Country & Billboard Charts, including 15 #1 songs, while remaining one of Music's Top Folk Artist both in the U.S and in Europe.

In 1996 he was named International Independent Recording Artist of the Year,  in 2008 he won the Governor's Award as the #1 Artist in his home state of Ohio and in 2009 was honored by The Kentucky State Senate for his musical contributions to Appalachia. He is an Ohio Arts Council and Midwest Arts Council "Ohio Artist On Tour ".

In 2000 he received a lifetime achievement award from Airplay International in Nashville for his decades of international airplay. His song "Siege at Lucasville", about the 1993 Ohio prison riot was filmed by CBS TV's 48 Hours in 1996 and his song "Our Hometown" is featured in the PBS documentary Beyond These Walls.

In 2009 he was honored by being named an Official "Ohio Treasure".

In 2014 he has performed on PBS, NPR, and The Nashville Network and been featured in the AFM International Magazine, GTE Music Magazine in Nashville and numerous other music industry magazines and newspaper articles.

Song history
In 2012 he began writing a song titled "A Million Years" before his mother Florence Elizabeth (Thompson) LeBrun Free Wagner died on December 19, 2012. He recorded it in 2014 in memory of his mother. She never got to hear the song but she did get to see the lyrics of it.

Venues
Steve Free and his band are dedicated to performing throughout the Tri-State area at diverse locations such as Camden Park and smaller venues such as Moyer's Winery and the Ye Olde Lantern in Portsmouth, Ohio They also perform at various festivals in the southern Ohio area.

References

External links
 Steve Free's Homepage
 Steve Free's Facebook Page
 Scioto County Storm Chaser Center's Online Radio Station
 Powersource Magazine
 Ohio State University
 GTE Music Magazine
 ASCAP
 Steve Free - GTE Music Magazine Cover Story

Living people
People from Portsmouth, Ohio
Musicians from Tucson, Arizona
1950 births
Guitarists from Arizona
20th-century American guitarists
Guitarists from Ohio